Tarn Taran was a Lok Sabha constituency in Punjab, India. This constituency was dissolved in 2009 and replaced by Khadoor Sahib.

Members of Parliament

^bypoll

2008 onwards : Khadoor Sahib

Election results

1989

See also
 Tarn Taran Sahib
 Khadoor Sahib Lok Sabha constituency
 List of Constituencies of the Lok Sabha

Former Lok Sabha constituencies of Punjab, India
2008 disestablishments in India
Constituencies disestablished in 2008
Former constituencies of the Lok Sabha